East Africans may refer to

peoples of East African descent, see: 
Ethiopid race (Cushites)
Hamites
Nilotic peoples
the contemporary demographics of East Africa, see: 

List of ethnic groups of Africa

See also
East African  (disambiguation)
Capoid
Haplogroup L3 (mtDNA)